Temnora rattrayi is a moth of the family Sphingidae. It is known from forests in Congo and Uganda.

The length of the forewings is about 16 mm for males and 17–21 mm for females. The upperside of the head, thorax and abdomen are olive-brown with a blackish brown medial line on the head and thorax. The underside of the head, thorax and abdomen underside are brownish-buff. The forewing upperside has basal and antemedian bands. There is a triangular brown band, distally bordered by a thin white line followed by a darker line. There is also a triangular patch distal to these lines not strongly contrasting with the rest of the wing. The hindwing upperside is mummy-brown, with a paler submarginal line at the tornus.

Subspecies
Temnora rattrayi rattrayi
Temnora rattrayi hassoni Cadiou, 2003 (Democratic Republic of the Congo)

References

Temnora
Moths described in 1894
Insects of Uganda
Fauna of the Republic of the Congo
Fauna of Gabon
Moths of Africa